Armand Van De Kerkhove (29 October 1915 – 7 December 2012) was a Belgian footballer. He played in two matches for the Belgium national football team in 1940.

References

External links
 

1915 births
2012 deaths
Belgian footballers
Belgium international footballers
Place of birth missing
Association football defenders